Bishidu is a town of Echeng District, Ezhou, Hubei, People's Republic of China, located about  south-southwest of downtown Ezhou and is served by China National Highway 106.

Geography

Administrative divisions
, it had one residential community and 10 villages under its administration.
As of 2016, Bishi administered:

Demographics

See also
List of township-level divisions of Hubei

References

Township-level divisions of Hubei
Ezhou